German Araoz (born in Tucuman, Argentina) is an Argentine professional rugby union player. He played for Glasgow Warriors at the Loosehead Prop position.

He has two international caps for Argentina. The first was in Santiago, Chile versus Brazil on May 23, 2012. The second, also in Santiago, was three days later on May 26, 2012 against Chile.

He played for Jockey Club Tucuman in Argentina.

He played for a Pampas XV in the Vodacom Cup in 2011-12.

Araoz signed a short-term deal with Glasgow Warriors on 16 October 2012. Gregor Townsend signed the player after a spate of injuries to the Warriors' front row.

He played 4 matches for the Warriors, 2 of which were crucially 1872 Cup matches against Edinburgh Rugby. Glasgow won both matches and retained the cup.

On leaving Glasgow, Araoz signed a deal with Rugby Viadana in Italy.

References

External links 

ESPN Profile
Warriors sign Araoz

Living people
Argentine rugby union players
Glasgow Warriors players
1985 births
Argentina international rugby union players
Rugby union props
Sportspeople from Tucumán Province